The Río Blanco (Spanish for "white river") is a river of Chile. The mouth of the river is located close to Chile Route 60.

Los Leones River is the main tributary of the river. The inferior course of the Río Blanco is adjacent to Río Blanco National Reserve.

See also
List of rivers of Chile

References

Rivers of Chile
Rivers of Valparaíso Region